John Rooney was an Irish Farmers' Party politician. He was elected to the Third Dáil at the 1922 general election for the Dublin County constituency, but was defeated at the 1923 general election. He stood again at the June 1927 general election as a Cumann na nGaedheal candidate, but did not regain his seat.

References

Year of birth missing
Year of death missing
Farmers' Party (Ireland) TDs
Cumann na nGaedheal politicians
Members of the 3rd Dáil
People of the Irish Civil War (Pro-Treaty side)